Saint-Mathieu-de-Laprairie Aerodrome  is located  west southwest of Saint-Mathieu-de-Laprairie, Quebec, Canada. It is owned and operated by Philip Lane, who has been in the aviation industry since 2006.

References

Registered aerodromes in Montérégie
Transport in Roussillon Regional County Municipality